Cladonia peziziformis or the turban cup lichen is a species of cup lichen in the family Cladoniaceae.

References

peziziformis